Aksarayspor is a Turkish sports club based in Aksaray. The football club previously played in the TFF Third League.

 
Association football clubs established in 1967
Sport in Aksaray
Football clubs in Turkey
1967 establishments in Turkey